Merv Gordon is a former association football player who represented New Zealand at international level.

Gordon made his full All Whites debut in a 1–7 loss to Australia on 4 July 1936 and ended his international playing career with four official caps to his credit, his final cap an appearance in a 1–4 loss to South Africa on 19 July 1947.

References 

New Zealand association footballers
New Zealand international footballers
Year of birth missing (living people)
Living people
Association football central defenders